Darlington Probation Station was a convict penal settlement on Maria Island, Tasmania (then Van Diemen's Land), from 1825 to 1832, then later a convict probation station during the last phase of convict management in eastern Australia (1842–1850).

A number of the buildings and structures have survived from this earlier era relatively intact and in good condition, and of the 78 convict probation stations once built in Tasmania, the buildings and structures at Maria Island are regarded as "the most outstanding representative example", of such cultural significance they've been formally inscribed onto the Australian National Heritage List  and UNESCO's World Heritage list as amongst:

" .. the best surviving examples of large-scale convict transportation and the colonial expansion of European powers through the presence and labour of convicts."

See also
 Australian Convict Sites
 Maria Island National Park: First Convict Era (1825-1832)
 Maria Island National Park: Second Convict Era (1842-1850)

External links

References

World Heritage Sites in Tasmania
Australian National Heritage List
 
Defunct prisons in Tasmania
Protected areas of Tasmania
1825 establishments in Australia
Convictism in Tasmania